Lemon Jelly can be:
 Lemon Jelly, a British electronica duo.
 Lemon jelly, the lemon flavoured variety of a gelatin dessert known as jelly in most of the Commonwealth Nations, and generically as jello in the United States and Canada.